Antonio Ferrante Gonzaga (9 December 1687 – 16 April 1729) was the reigning Duke of Guastalla and a member of the House of Gonzaga.

Early life 
He was the son of Vincenzo Gonzaga, Duke of Guastalla and his second wife, who was also his cousin, Princess Maria Vittoria Gonzaga of Guastalla (1659-1707). His sister was Eleonora Luisa Gonzaga, sister in law to Cosimo III de' Medici, Grand Duke of Tuscany.
He succeeded his father in 1714.

Personal life 
He was engaged to Maria Karolina Sobieska, granddaughter of John III Sobieski but Maria Karolina (known as Charlotte) refused and married Frédéric Maurice Casimir de La Tour d'Auvergne, Prince of Turenne instead.

He married first with Margherita Cesarini (1695-1725).  After death of his first wife, he was remarried on 23 February 1727 in Darmstadt to Landgravine Theodora of Hesse-Darmstadt (6 February 1706 – 23 January 1784), daughter of Prince Philip of Hesse-Darmstadt and his wife, Princess Marie Therese Ernestine of Croy-Havré (1673-1714). She was also granddaughter of Louis VI, Landgrave of Hesse-Darmstadt.
These marriages remained childless.

Death 
Antonio Ferrante was burned alive in an accident in his capital, Guastalla. After his death, the Duchy was inherited by his younger brother Giuseppe Gonzaga.

Ancestry

References

Sources 
 

1687 births
1729 deaths
Antonio Ferrante
Antonio Ferrante
17th-century Italian nobility
18th-century Italian people